Robin Skelton (12 October 1925 – 22 August 1997) was a British-born academic, writer, poet, and anthologist.

Biography
Born in Easington, Yorkshire, Skelton was educated at the University of Leeds and Cambridge University. From 1944 to 1947, he served with the Royal Air Force in India. He later taught at Manchester University, where he was a founder member of The Peterloo Group. In 1963, he emigrated to Canada, and began teaching at the University of Victoria in British Columbia.

Skelton was an authority on Irish literature. He is well known for his work as a literary editor; he was a founder and editor, with John Peter, of The Malahat Review, and a translator. Known as a practising Wiccan, Skelton also published a number of books on the subject of the occult and other neopagan religions.

Georges Zuk, a purported French surrealist poet, was a heteronym created by Skelton.

Writers he influenced include Jordan Stratford.

Bibliography

Poetry
Patmos, And Other Poems (1955)
The Poetic Pattern (1956)
Third Day Lucky (1958)
The Cavalier Poets (1960)
Begging the Dialect: Poems and Ballads (1960)
Two Ballads of the Muse (1960)
The Dark Window (1962
A Valedictory Poem Upon His Departure from Manchester, England, for the New World (1963)
An Irish Gathering (1964)
A Ballad of Billy Barker (1965)
Because of This and Other Poems (1968)
The Hold of Our Hands : Eight Letters to Sylvia (1968)
Selected Poems, 1947–1967 (1968)
An Irish Album (1969)
Answers: Poems (1969)
The Hunting Dark (1971)
Private Speech: Messages, 1962–1970 (1971)
A Different Mountain, Messages 1962 – 1970: Poems And Photo-Collages (1971)
Remembering Synge (1971)
Musebook (1972)
Three For Herself (1972)
Country Songs (1973)
Time Light (1974)
The Limners (1975)
Callsigns (1976)
Mystics Mild: Song (1976)
Because of Love (1977)
Three Poems (1977)
Landmarks (1979)
They Call It the Cariboo (1980)
Limits (1981)
Collected Shorter Poems, 1947–1977 (1981)
Zuk (1982)
The Paper Cage (1982)
De Nihilo (1982)
Wordsong: Twelve Ballads (1983)
The Collected Longer Poems, 1947–1977 (1985)
Distances (1985)
Telling the Tale (1987)
Openings (1988)
Celtic Contraries (1989)
A Formal Music: Poems in Classical Metres (1993)
Popping Fuchsias: Poems, 1987–1992 (1992)
A Formal Music: Poems In Classical Metres (1993)
Islands: Poems in The Traditional Forms And Metres Of Japan (1993)
I Am Me: Rhymes For Small (1994)
A Way of Walking : Poems in the Traditional Forms and Metres of Japan (1994)
Wrestling the Angel: Collected Shorter Poems, 1947–1977 (1994)
Samhain (1994)
The Edge Of Time: Poems And Translations (1995)
Three for Nick (1995)
One Leaf Shaking: Collected Later Poems, 1977–1990 (1996)
A Further Spring: Love Poems (1996)
Lens of Crystal: Poems (1996)
Long, Long Ago (1996)
Love Poems: A Further Spring (1996)
Or So I Say: Contentions and Confessions – A Happenstance Book (1998)
The Shapes of Our Singing (1999)
The Shapes of Our Singing: A Guide to the Meters and Set Forms of Verse from Around the World (2002)
In This Poem I Am(2007)

Fiction
The Man Who Sang In His Sleep (1984)
The Parrot Who Could (1987)
Fires of the Kindred (1987)
Hanky-Panky and Other Stories (1990)
Higgledy Piggledy (1992)

Non-fiction
John Ruskin: The Final Years (1955)
Teach Yourself Poetry (1963)
The Practice of Poetry (1971)
J. M. Synge and His World (1971, US title: The Writings of J. M. Synge)
The Poet's Calling (1975)
Poetic Truth (1978)
Spellcraft: A Manual of Verbal Magic (1978)
Herbert Siebner (1979)
They Call It The Cariboo (1980)
Magical Practice of Talismans (1985, US title: Talismanic Magic)
Practice of Witchcraft Today: An Introduction to Beliefs & Rituals of the Old Religion (1988)
A Gathering of Ghosts (1989, with Jean Kozocari)
A Witches' Book of Ghosts and Exorcism (1990, with Jean Kozocari)
Earth Air, Fire, Water : Pre-Christian and Pagan Elements in British Songs, Rhymes and Ballads (1990, with Margaret Blackwood)
Practice of Witchcraft Today: An Introduction To Beliefs and Rituals (1990)
The Record of A Logophile (1990)
A Devious Dictionary (1991)

Memoir
The Memoirs of A Literary Blockhead (1988)
Portrait of My Father (1989)

Anthologies
Translations by J. M. Synge (1961)
Edward Thomas: Selected Poems (1962)
Collected Works of J. M. Synge (1962)
Six Irish Poets: Austin Clarke, Richard Kell, Thomas Kinsella, John Montague, Richard Murphy, Richard Weber (1962)
Penguin Book of Poetry of the Thirties (1963)
Collected Poems of David Gascoyne (1965)
The World of W B Yeats: Essays in Perspective (1965, with Anne Saddlemyer)
Irish Renaissance: A Gathering of Essays, Memoirs and Letters from the Massachusetts Review (1965, with David R. Clark)
Inscriptions (1967, with Herbert Siebner)
Five Poets of the Pacific Northwest (1968)
Poetry of the Forties (1968)
Contemporary Poetry of British Columbia (1970)
Collected Verse Translations of David Gascoyne (1970)
Herbert Read: A Memorial Symposium (1970)
Collected Plays of Jack B. Yeats (1971)
Selected Poems Of Byron (1971)
Introductions from an Island 1973: New Writing for Students in the Creative Writing Programme (1973)
A Gathering in Celebration of the Eightieth Birthday of Robert Graves (1975, edited  with William Thomas)
Six Poets of British Columbia (1980)
From Syria by Ezra Pound (1981)
Herbert Siebner: A Celebration (1993)
Dark Seasons A Selection of Georg Trakl Poems (1994)

Translations
Georges Zuk: Selected Verse (1969)
200 Poems from the Greek Anthology (1971)
The Underwear of the Unicorn by Georges Zuk (1975)
George Faludy: Selected Poems, 1933–80 (1985)
Briefly Singing : A Gathering of Erotic Satirical and Other Inscriptions Epigrams and Lyrics from the Greek and Roman Mediterranean 800 BC – AD 1000 Including the Complete Poems of Rufinus (1994)
Rufinus. The Complete Poems (1997)

References

Robin Skelton. The Record of A Logophile. Victoria: Reference West, 1990.
Barbara L. Turner, ed. Skelton at 60. Erin, Ont.: Porcupine's Quill, 1986.

External links
Robin Skelton fonds at University of Victoria Libraries, Special Collections and University Archives
Profile of Robin Skelton at The Wicca.ca
Archive material at Leeds University Library
A Short Biography
Dundurn Press

1925 births
1997 deaths
20th-century Canadian poets
Canadian male poets
British emigrants to Canada
English Wiccans
Canadian Wiccans
People from Holderness
Royal Air Force personnel of World War II
People educated at Pocklington School
20th-century English poets
20th-century Canadian male writers
Wiccan writers
Modern pagan poets